William Wallace Destler (born August 26, 1946) is an American university professor and administrator.  In 2017 he retired after having served for exactly 10 years as the 9th president of the Rochester Institute of Technology. He held the position from July 1, 2007, succeeding Albert J. Simone.

Previously, Destler was provost and senior vice president for student affairs at the University of Maryland, College Park from 2001 to 2007.  He also served as a professor of electrical engineering in the college of engineering, dean of the graduate school (1999–2001), and dean of the engineering school (1994–1997) at Maryland.

Destler received his bachelor's degree from the Stevens Institute of Technology in 1968, and a Ph.D. in applied physics from Cornell University in 1972.  His research specialized in "high-power microwave sources and advanced accelerator technologies".

Destler collects antique banjos; the number of instruments in his collection is purportedly more than 160. Destler is also an amateur folk musician and is a founding member of the Baltimore Folk Music Society. Destler released his first record, September Sky, in 1973. It was re-released in 2010 as a CD in S. Korea.  Destler also sang with the a capella trio, Rock Creek, with Wally Macnow and Thomas McHenry.  He sang with them on  Sharon Mountain Harmony on the Folk Legacy label and their self produced album Rock Creek. His latest CD, Would You Have Time, was released in 2016.

More recently, Destler has gained an interest in hybrid and electric vehicles. His own vehicles, including a Toyota Prius, a Chevy Volt and Tesla Model S, are often on display during Imagine RIT, where Destler is more than happy to personally explain the technology behind the vehicles.

In 2010, he approved the termination of RIT's quarter system, effectively switching the school to a semester system beginning in 2013. The decision was favored by the voting members of faculty and staff inside the Saunders College of Business, B. Thomas Golisano College of Computing & Information Sciences, College of Imaging Arts & Sciences, College of Liberal Arts, National Technical Institute for the Deaf, College of Science, Staff Council, and the RIT Student Government. It was opposed by voting members of the College of Applied Science & Technology, the Kate Gleason College of Engineering, the National Technical Institute for the Deaf, and the College of Science. 64% of students participating in an online poll voted to remain on the quarter system, while 18% voted for the semester system.

Retirement

In an email to the entirety of the Rochester Institute of Technology, Destler announced his retirement from the presidency of RIT effective June 30, 2017. He was succeeded by Dr. David Munson Jr. who was previously the Robert J. Vlasic Dean of Engineering at the University of Michigan, where he served two 5 year terms.

References

External links

Presidents of Rochester Institute of Technology
University of Maryland, College Park faculty
Stevens Institute of Technology alumni
Cornell University alumni
Living people
1946 births
People from Rochester, New York